Wyoming's 29th State Senate district is one of 30 districts in the Wyoming Senate. It has been represented by Republican Senator Drew Perkins.

List of members representing the district

Recent election results

Federal and statewide results

2006

2010

2014

2018
Republican Incumbent Drew Perkins won the election with no challengers.

References

External links

Wyoming Senate districts